Green Carriage is a 2015 Russian drama film directed by Oleg Asadulin.

Plot 
The film tells about a successful director whose life collapses in an instant.

Cast 
 Andrey Merzlikin
 Viktoriya Isakova
 Viktoriya Klinkova
 Peter Kovrizhnykh
 Ivan Kudashov
 Andrey Leonov
 Vladimir Menshov
 Aleksandr Michkov
 Valentina Ananina		
 Dmitriy Astrakhan

References

External links 
 

2015 films
2010s Russian-language films
Russian drama films
2015 drama films